Ficus gracilis is a species of sea snail, a marine gastropod mollusk in the family Ficidae, the fig shells.

References

 Verhaeghe, M. & Poppe, G.T. (2000) A Conchological Iconography 3: The family Ficidae. Hackenheim: Conchbooks
 Liu, J.Y. [Ruiyu] (ed.). (2008). Checklist of marine biota of China seas. China Science Press. 1267 pp.
 Richmond, M. (Ed.) (1997). A guide to the seashores of Eastern Africa and the Western Indian Ocean islands. Sida/Department for Research Cooperation, SAREC: Stockholm, Sweden. ISBN 91-630-4594-X. 448 pp.

External links
 Sowerby, G. B. I. (1825). A catalogue of the shells contained in the collection of the late Earl of Tankerville: arranged according to the Lamarckian conchological system: together with an appendix, containing descriptions of many new species- London, vii + 92 + xxxiv pp.
 Kiener L.C. 1840-1841. Spécies général et iconographie des coquilles vivantes. Vol. 6. Famille des Canalifères. Deuxième partie. Genres Pyrule (Pyrula), Lamarck, pp. 1-34, pl. 1-15

Ficidae
Gastropods described in 1825